Marcella Rovena (22 January 1905 – 6 October 1991) was an Italian film and voice actress. Born in Conegliano, she started her career on the big screen in 1932 with director Nunzio Malasomma in the film ''La telefonista''.

Filmography

External links

1905 births
1991 deaths
Italian voice actresses
People from Conegliano
20th-century Italian actresses